A Note of Triumph: The Golden Age of Norman Corwin is a 2005 documentary short subject about writer Norman Corwin. In addition to Corwin, the cast includes Robert Altman, Norman Lear, Walter Cronkite, Studs Terkel, and radio historians Timothy Troy and Norman Gilliland.

On March 5, 2006, it won the Academy Award for Best Documentary (Short Subject).

References

External links 
 
 NormanCorwin.com

2005 films
American short documentary films
Documentary films about World War II
Best Documentary Short Subject Academy Award winners
Films directed by Eric Simonson
Documentary films about writers
Works by Eric Simonson
2005 short documentary films
Documentary films about radio people
2000s English-language films
2000s American films